The 2017 Women's International Match Racing Series was a series of match racing sailing regattas staged during 2017 season.

Regattas

Standings

References

External links
 Official website

2017
2017 in sailing